John Gould formally describes the now extinct Norfolk Island kaka
Thomas C. Jerdon a pioneer of Indian ornithology arrives in Madras
Andrew Smith describes new birds in Report of the Expedition for Exploring Central Africa. Some are the African pygmy falcon, the red-billed buffalo weaver, the white-browed sparrow weaver the southern white-crowned shrike, the Kalahari scrub robin and the great sparrow
Death of Bernhard Meyer
Death of Edward Turner Bennett
Adolphe-Simon Neboux joins the French exploration ship La Venus as surgeon naturalist
William Yarrell becomes secretary of the Zoological Society of London

Ongoing events
John Gould  Proceedings of the Zoological Society of London 1836  New birds described  by Gould in this journal in 1836 include the blue-billed duck, the black currawong, the white-eared bulbul, the greater necklaced laughingthrush, the black-headed trogon and the black-breasted parrotbill
William Jardine and Prideaux John Selby with the co-operation of James Ebenezer Bicheno Illustrations of Ornithology various publishers (Four volumes) 1825 and [1836–43]. Although issued partly in connection with the volume of plates, under the same title (at the time of issue), text and plates were purchasable separately and the publishers ... express the hope, also voiced by the author in his preface to the present work, that the text will constitute an independent work of reference. Vol. I was issued originally in 1825 [by A. Constable, Edinburgh], with nomenclature according to Temminck 

Birding and ornithology by year
1836 in science